Greer's elf skink  (Nannoscincus greeri) is a species of skink found in New Caledonia.

References

Nannoscincus
Reptiles described in 1987
Skinks of New Caledonia
Endemic fauna of New Caledonia
Taxa named by Ross Allen Sadlier